Francis Wollaston (6 June 1694, in London – 27 December 1774) was an English scientist. He was elected a Fellow of the Royal Society in 1723. Wollaston was the third son of William Wollaston. He was educated at Sidney Sussex College, Cambridge.

Family
He married Mary Fauquier, daughter of John Francis Fauquier and sister of Lt. Gov. Francis Fauquier of Virginia Colony, in 1728 and they had the following children:

 Mary Wollaston (1730–1813) married William Heberden
 Francis Wollaston (1731–1815), priest and astronomer
 Charlton Wollaston (1733–1764), physician
 William Henry Wollaston, (1737–1759) 
 George Wollaston (1738–1826) (FRS)

References

1694 births
1774 deaths
Fellows of the Royal Society
Alumni of Sidney Sussex College, Cambridge